Hesketh Benjamin (born 26 August 1959) is a Kittitian cricketer. He played in ten first-class matches for the Leeward Islands from 1964 to 1969.

See also
 List of Leeward Islands first-class cricketers

References

External links
 

1959 births
Living people
Kittitian cricketers
Leeward Islands cricketers